Olema Valley is a gorge formed by the San Andreas Fault in rural west Marin County, Northern California. The valley runs from the southern end of Tomales Bay through Point Reyes Station, the town of Olema, and Dogtown, to the Bolinas Lagoon, which lies between Bolinas and Stinson Beach. It is part of the Golden Gate National Recreation Area.

References

Valleys of Marin County, California
West Marin